Matela may refer to:

Places

Portugal
Antas e Matela, a parish in the municipality of Penalva do Castelo, Viseu
Matela, a parish in the municipality of Vimioso, Bragança

Nepal
Matela, Bheri, a village in Surkhet District
Matela, Seti, a village in Bajhang District

People
Len Matela (born 1980), retired American professional basketball player
Leszek Matela (born 1955), Polish journalist

See also
Mattress (French: matelas)
Ha Matela (disambiguation)